Richard Alan Badanjek (born April 25, 1962) is a former American football running back in the National Football League for the Washington Redskins and Atlanta Falcons. Having grown up the son of interracial parents, he was a 1981 graduate of Chalker High School in the tiny rural town of Southington, Ohio, where he led the Wildcats to their best season in school history his senior year at 9-1, winning Team MVP. He ran for 5,336 yards throughout his four years at the prep level, including over 2,000 yards and winning the OHSAA Class A Offensive Back of the Year his senior season. In a game against Ledgemont High School in 1980, Badanjek rushed for around 475 yards, en route to a 45-8 victory. 

He played college football at the University of Maryland and was drafted in the seventh round of the 1986 NFL Draft by the Washington Redskins (now known as the Washington Commanders). He played in Washington for one season before being traded to the Atlanta Falcons, where he started two games during the NFLPA strike of 1987. That year, he rushed for 87 yards on 29 carries and caught 6 passes for 35 yards, while running for a three-yard touchdown in Week 5 against the San Francisco 49ers.

College Career 
Graduating from Chalker High School, after an illustrious career at the small school, Badanjek committed to the University of Maryland.

College Statistics

Professional Career 
Badanjeck was drafted 186th in the seventh round in the 1986 NFL Draft.

Professional Statistics

References

1962 births
Living people
Sportspeople from Warren, Ohio
American football running backs
Maryland Terrapins football players
Washington Redskins players
Atlanta Falcons players
National Football League replacement players